Qusai Al-Jaafreh (born January 8, 1992) is a Jordanian footballer who plays as a defender.

References

External links

1992 births
Association football midfielders
Jordanian footballers
Living people
Sahab SC players
That Ras Club players
Al-Faisaly SC players
Al-Ahli SC (Amman) players
Shabab Al-Ordon Club players
Mansheyat Bani Hasan players
Jordanian Pro League players